Momenta is an autonomous driving company headquartered in Beijing, China that aims to build the 'Brains' for autonomous vehicles.

In December 2021, Momenta and BYD established a 100 million yuan ($15.7 million) joint venture to deploy autonomous driving capabilities across certain BYD car model lines. The new venture, called DiPi Intelligent Mobility Co and located in Shenzhen, combines BYD's capabilities as an automaker with Momenta's experience in intelligent driving. Earlier in December, Momenta and SAIC Mobility, a unit of Chinese automaker SAIC Motor, began offering autonomous robotaxi test rides to the public in a Shanghai district as part of a trial.

Momenta finalized its Series C Financing round of more than $US 1 billion. The financing was led by key strategic investors including Shanghai Automotive Industry Corp. (SAIC), General Motors (GM), Toyota Motor Company, and Bosch. Additionally, Temasek, Yunfeng Fund, Mercedes-Benz, IDG Capital, GGV, Jiyuan Capital, Shunwei Capital, Tencent, and Cathay Capital rounded out the Series C investors.

Momenta received a $300 million investment in September, 2021, from GM. GM said the investment will speed up the development of next-generation self-driving technologies in China. 

Momenta has also received $500 million from SAIC Motor, Toyota Motor and auto parts supplier Bosch, as the global auto industry pursues the autonomous future.

Other investors in the funding round include Daimler AG, Temasek, Yunfeng Capital and Tencent.

Momenta was founded in September 2016 by Cao Xudong, a former scientist at Microsoft Research and formerly executive director of research and development at Chinese face recognition start-up SenseTime.

References 

https://apnews.com/article/business-technology-china-3ac51a2f83d29fffa9807a5b74b02070
https://www.reuters.com/article/us-momenta-autonomous-fundraising/autonomous-driving-startup-momenta-raises-500-million-from-saic-toyota-others-idUSKBN2BB08W

https://www.bloomberg.com/news/articles/2021-11-03/china-s-momenta-raises-200-million-in-self-driving-cars-push

External links 
 Official Website (english)

Self-driving car companies
Companies based in Beijing